is a fictional character from the Tekken fighting game series released by Namco Bandai Games. Hwoarang first appeared in Tekken 3 and he has returned in all subsequent games. He is the Taekwondo student of Baek Doo San, and entered the third Tournament to get revenge on Ogre for attacking his master. He also became Jin Kazama's rival after the two fought to a draw in one of Hwoarang's street matches before the events of Tekken 3.

Appearances

In video games
Born in South Korea, a proud student of Baek Doo San and extremely proficient in the martial art of Taekwondo, Hwoarang used his skills to gamble in street fights with his other gang members. During these street fights, Hwoarang would lure his opponents in by sending his gang members to pose as weaker fighters. Once his gang members had been defeated, Hwoarang would enter and defeat his opponents to win the money at stake. One day, Hwoarang lured in an opponent by the name of Jin Kazama and they fought to a draw. This was the first time Hwoarang did not outright win a match and he immediately rushed to his master to tell him the news. Upon arriving at Baek Doo San's dojo, Hwoarang finds that his master had been apparently slain by Ogre, The God of Fighting. Hwoarang enters The King of Iron Fist Tournament 3 to defeat Jin Kazama and to seek revenge for his master, Hwoarang got to fight Jin in the later stages of the tournament but he was narrowly defeated after an hours-long fight very similar to the fight between Jin's father Kazuya Mishima and his rival Paul Phoenix in the first King of Iron Fist Tournament.

Returning to South Korea, Hwoarang was drafted into the South Korean military and was assigned to a special operations division. Although his successes in various missions were highly regarded along with his prowess at Taekwondo and combat techniques, his penchant for disobeying rules and orders gave his senior officers more than a few headaches. Hwoarang was uninterested in military life and felt a strange emptiness within him. He longingly recalled the days of hustling money in street fights and the rush he experienced from hand-to-hand combat. He often thought of one fight in particular - the fight against Jin Kazama. These longings could not be quelled by the military. One day, Hwoarang found out about the announcement of The King of Iron Fist Tournament 4. Hwoarang's blood stirred. He would defeat Jin, Heihachi Mishima, and anyone else who dared to challenge him to claim the Mishima Zaibatsu. Filled with excitement he hasn't felt in years, Hwoarang slipped away from the military base and headed for the Tournament.

The South Korean Army took Hwoarang into custody during the later stages of the King of Iron Fist Tournament 4, keeping him from his long-awaited fight with Jin Kazama. Upon his arrival at the embassy, Hwoarang is granted an official pardon by the ambassador and is given urgent military papers. Hwoarang immediately flies to South Korea to complete his training, which he completes in time to enter The King of Iron Fist Tournament 5, once again hoping to get a rematch with Jin Kazama. In The King of Iron Fist Tournament 5, Hwoarang faced Jin and defeated him in the later stages of the tournament. While Jin was lying on the ground, suddenly, he roars paranormally and produces a gale that blows Hwoarang away. From Jin's back, two black wings spread, and Jin stands up in his devil form. Hwoarang is at his wits end. He is not able to fight back, and soon he is knocked unconscious.

When Hwoarang wakes up, he finds himself in the hospital. Nearby, he sees Baek, who he thought was killed, standing as a visitor. Hwoarang hears the details from Baek. He ignores his nurse and tries to move from his bed. He falls down in order to beseech Baek to make him stronger. After leaving the hospital, Hwoarang starts training with unprecedented devoutness in order to defeat the "paranormal" Jin. Thus, with the announcement of The King of Iron Fist Tournament 6, he prepares for the tournament..

Hwoarang appears in Tekken 7, being one of the eighteen characters initially available in the game. In both of his and Devil Jin's endings reveals that Hwoarang lost his right eye after saving Jin from a grenade thrown by some of the UN soldiers who are pursuing Jin. His ending however, is correctly takes place before Lars rescue Jin, where Hwoarang finally defeated his rival’s devil form, but still unsatisfied about killing a monster like Jin.

Hwoarang also appears in Tekken Card Challenge, Tekken Tag Tournament, Tekken Advance, Tekken 3D: Prime Edition, Tekken Tag Tournament 2 and Tekken Revolution. Hwoarang appears in Capcom-made crossover fighting game Street Fighter X Tekken, with Steve Fox as his official tag partner.

In other media
Hwoarang appears in three Tekken comics, Tekken Saga (1997) (unreleased issue), Tekken: Tatakai no Kanatani (2000) and Tekken Forever (2003). Hwoarang appears in the opening sequence of Tekken: The Motion Picture, along with Jin Kazama, Ling Xiaoyu, Eddy Gordo, Forest Law, Wang Jinrei and Kunimitsu. A dossier on Hwoarang is briefly seen in the CGI film Tekken: Blood Vengeance when Anna Williams opens a file containing dossiers on various persons of interest. Hwoarang appears in the Tekken Tag Tournament 2 live-action short film portrayed by Daren Nop.

Character design
Hwoarang is a young Korean man with distinctly orange hair. His Player 1 costume usually consists of a white, long sleeved taekwondo dobok with a stripe along the seams, with matching pants and bandanna, and a black belt. He also sports fingerless blue gloves and blue footpads that expose his heels and toes. His name is printed on the back of the shirt in his first appearance, while in later games, the Korean flag is shown. His original Player 2 costume consisted of a gray tank top, with green jeans with and black chaps, as well as fingerless gloves, a black leather belt and cowboy boots complete with spurs. He is also wearing motorcycle goggles which are pushed up out of the way. From Tekken 5 and onwards, this look gets updated almost each game. In Tekken 4, instead of a biker outfit, he wears a military uniform. All his outfits except his military uniform seem to feature a red hawk emblem which is in reference to Hwoarang's nickname Blood Talon. These can be found in the back of all his biker outfits along with his dobok and pants for his standard Taekwondo uniform. Hwoarang's name is based on the Hwarang, a group of elite male youth in Silla, an ancient Korean Kingdom. The belt of Hwoarang's standard dobok indicates that he is a 2nd dan in I.T.F standards (As his belt contains two tags), but is also personalized to have his name on it as well. His Tekken 7: Fated Retribution outfit consists of a casual white t-shirt and torn jeans. He now has an eyepatch on his right eye, and his hair is now black with an orange streak.

Gameplay and fighting style
Hwoarang excels in pressuring opponents from all ranges, being able to pressure opponents with his mixups at close range, having much leisure to choose whether to close in or to back away at middle range, and whiff punishing enemies from a long range, but he lacks defensive tools that prevent himself from being pressured.

Reception
In 2013, Complex ranked Hwoarang as the 13th best Tekken character, commenting: "Hwoarang is the pretty boy of the Tekken universe – an arrogant bad boy with androgynous hair and a penchant for motorcycles." 4thletter placed Hwoarang's and Steve's Street Fighter X Tekken ending at 85th place in their list of top 200 fighting game endings. Smosh named Hwoarang as one of the "Video Game Characters Who Would Win a Gold Medal at the Summer Olympics", adding: "The only reason he hasn’t entered the Olympics is because he probably considers them to be beneath him." PlayStation Universe included Hwoarang and Jin Kazama among the top 5 rival pairs in Tekken Tag Tournament 2, commenting: "Jin’s traditional karate style marries well with Hwoarang’s fancy footwork, and the disparity between each style – Jin’s a bit of a bruiser while Hwoarang’s style is more intricate – makes for a devastating combination of tactics when used correctly." In 2012, Digital Spy readers voted Hwoarang as the second favorite Tekken character, with 8.1% of the votes. Paste ranked Hwoarang as the "17th best Tekken character", stating "Rival to series protagonist Jin Kazama, he spends most of his days looking to fight his mortal enemy, often matching him in strength whenever they meet on the battlefield." Additionally, Den of Geek named him as the "22nd greatest Tekken character" commenting "Hwoarang is almost like a commentary on how these fighting game tournaments escalate. On the surface, he’s a proud martial artist who just wants to be the best and prove himself. He’s got a huge ego, but otherwise, he’s fairly basic." In the official poll by Namco, Hwoarang is ranked as the 15th most requested Tekken character to be playable in Tekken X Street Fighter, at 7.73% of votes.

References

Fictional characters missing an eye
Fictional South Korean people in video games
Fictional martial artists in video games
Fictional male martial artists
Fictional taekwondo practitioners
Male characters in video games
Fictional military personnel in video games
Tekken characters
Video game characters introduced in 1997